Padangkelapa is a village in the Batang Hari Regency in the Jambi Province of Sumatra, Indonesia.

Nearby towns and villages include Tanahgaro (12.0 nm), Peninjauan (7.3 nm), Mersam (3.2 nm), Sungairotan (3.2 nm), Singkatigedang (7.3 nm), Matagoal (12.0 nm), Kermio (11.2 nm), Jernih-tua (20.6 nm) and Durianluncuk (13.9 nm).

References

External links
Satellite map at Maplandia.com

Populated places in Jambi